Mohamed Omar (born January 22, 1999) is a Canadian soccer player who currently plays for the HFX Wanderers of the Canadian Premier League.

Early life 
In 2013, he joined the Toronto FC Academy. He later moved to the United States to attend high school at the Berkshire School, also playing club soccer with Black Rock FC. He was named the top high school player in Massachusetts in 2017. He later spent some time training with Toronto FC II when he returned home over the summer.

College career
In 2018, he began attending the University of Notre Dame, where he played for the men's soccer team. He scored his first goal on September 6, 2019 against the Seattle Redhawks. In his senior year in 2021, he was named team captain. He helped Notre Dame to the semifinals of the 2021 NCAA Division I Men's Soccer Tournament, where they lost to the eventual champions Clemson Tigers in penalty kicks.

Club career
In 2018, he played with Toronto FC III in League1 Ontario.

In 2019, he played with Chicago FC United in USL League Two.

At the 2022 MLS SuperDraft he was selected in the first round (23rd overall) by the Colorado Rapids. He attended pre-season with the club, but was unable to be signed to a contract due to roster limitations.

In February 2022, he signed a one-year contract with a club option for 2023 with the HFX Wanderers of the Canadian Premier League. He made his professional debut on April 23, coming on as a substitute against Pacific FC. In December 2022, HFX announced that they were exercising Omar's contract option, keeping him with the club through 2023.

International career
In 2018, he attended a training camp with the Canada U20 team.

Career statistics

Club

References

External links

1999 births
Living people
Canadian soccer players
Soccer players from Toronto
Association football midfielders
Berkshire School alumni
Major League Soccer draft picks
Colorado Rapids draft picks
Notre Dame Fighting Irish men's soccer players
Canadian Premier League players
League1 Ontario players
USL League Two players
Chicago FC United players
Toronto FC players
HFX Wanderers FC players